Carl Eugene Whitney (September 7, 1913 – July 1986) was a Negro league baseball player.

In 1942, Whitney played as a reserve outfielder for the New York Black Yankees, a team co-owned by financier James "Soldier Boy" Semler and famed toe-tapper Bill "Bojangles" Robinson. He also briefly played for the Newark Eagles in 1942. He is buried at Calvary Cemetery in St. Louis, Missouri.

Notes

References

External links
 and Seamheads
 

1913 births
1986 deaths
New York Black Yankees players
Newark Eagles players
Burials at Calvary Cemetery (St. Louis)
20th-century African-American sportspeople
Baseball outfielders